Barron v Potter [1914] 1 Ch 895 is a UK company law case, concerning the balance of power between the board of directors and the general meeting. It stands for the principle that when the board is incapable of taking action, power to conduct the company's affairs will revert to the general meeting.

Facts
Canon Barron was not on speaking terms with Mr. William James Potter, the other director of the British Seagumite Co Ltd. Their office was 28 Fleet Street. The constitution said that the quorum for a meeting was two (art 26). Mr. Potter was the chairman, with a casting vote. But Canon Barron was refusing to come to meetings. So on 23 February 1914, Mr. Potter came to meet Canon Barron, as he got off the train on a Paddington Station platform, from his country home (Woodham Ferris, Essex). He told Canon Barron they were now holding a board meeting. He proposed appointing more directors. Canon Barron objected. Mr. Potter said he was using his casting vote, and declared the motion effective. The report recorded Mr. Potter's version of the exchange as follows:

There followed a general meeting at which new directors were again said to be appointed, again with Canon Barron's objection. Canon Barron sought a declaration that the appointment of the directors were ineffective, arguing that the meeting on the train station was no meeting, and that the general meeting's resolution was invalid, since the board was the only organ that could appoint more directors.

Judgment
Warrington J held that in view of the deadlock, the power reverted to the general meeting. In this case, the appointments were valid. There had been no proper board meeting on the train platform, but the shareholder meeting was effective afterwards.

Another case [1915] 3 KB 593 followed, with Atkin J in the High Court, and Warrington LJ again in the Court of Appeal.

See also

John Shaw & Sons (Salford) Ltd v Shaw [1935] 2 KB 113

Notes

References

United Kingdom company case law
1914 in case law
1914 in British law
High Court of Justice cases